The 101st Rescue Squadron (101 RQS) is a unit of the New York Air National Guard 106th Rescue Wing stationed at Francis S. Gabreski Air National Guard Base, Westhampton Beach, New York.   The squadron is equipped with the HH-60G Pave Hawk helicopter, configured for combat search and rescue operations.

Overview
Established in 2004 by the Air Force Special Operations Command as part of a re-organization of Air National Guard rescue wings which created separate squadrons for fixed-wing, helicopter and pararescue elements of the 106th Rescue Wing.  Subsequently reverted to Air Combat Command.

The squadron maintains, supports and operates the HH-60G Pave Hawk helicopters of the 106th Rescue Wing.  It is an integral component of the 106th Operations Group, along with the HC-130J Combat King II search and rescue/aerial refueling aircraft of the 102d Rescue Squadron, transporting pararescue personnel of the 103d RQS in their mission.

History
For the history of the squadron prior to 2004, see 102nd Rescue Squadron.

References

 Rogers, B. (2006). United States Air Force Unit Designations Since 1978.

External links
 New York ANG: Francis Gabreski ANGB

Squadrons of the United States Air National Guard
Military units and formations in New York (state)
101
Military units and formations established in 2004